The Schaerbeek Beer Museum (French: Musée schaerbeekois de la bière; Dutch: Schaarbeeks Biermuseum) in the commune of Schaerbeek, Brussels, Belgium is a museum dedicated to Belgian beers. The museum, which is a not-for-profit association (in Belgium, an asbl), was founded in 1993 and officially opened in March, 1994.

The museum houses a collection of more than 1000 bottles of Belgian beer and their respective beer glasses. Also exhibited are beer making machines, tools, advertisements and the archives of breweries past and present. The museum also features a reconstruction of a tavern from the early 1900s.

A beer named la "Schaerbeekoise" is produced for the museum by the Brasserie des Rocs. This beer, as well as many other varieties of Belgian beer, is served in the museum's own tavern which is in the former workshops of a nearby school.

External links 

 Musée schaerbeekois de la bière - official site

Beer museums
Schaerbeek
Museums in Brussels